Ernst Marcus may refer to:

 Ernst Marcus (zoologist) (1893–1968), German zoologist
 Ernst Marcus (philosopher) (1856–1928), German lawyer and philosopher